Configure, price, quote (CPQ) software is a term used in business to describe software systems that help sellers quote complex and configurable products. An example could be a maker of heavy trucks. If the customer chooses a certain chassis (the base frame of a motor vehicle), the choice of engines may be limited, because certain engines might not fit a certain chassis. Given a certain choice of engine, the choice of trailer may be limited (e.g. a heavy trailer requires a stronger engine), and so on. If the product is highly configurable, the user may face combinatorial explosion, which means the rapid growth of the complexity of a problem. Thus a configuration engine is employed to alleviate this problem.

Configuration engines
The "configure" in CPQ deals with the complex challenges of combining components and parts into a more viable product.

There are three main approaches used to alleviate the problem of combinatorial explosion:
 Rule-based truth-maintenance systems: These systems were the first generation of configuration engines, launched in the 1970s based on research results in artificial intelligence going back to the 1960s. 
 Constraint satisfaction engines: These engines were developed in the 1980s and 1990s. They can handle the full set of configuration rules to alleviate the problem of combinatorial explosion but can be complex and difficult to maintain as rules have to be written to accommodate the intended use.
 Compile-based configurators: These configurators build upon constraint-based engines and research in Binary Decision Diagrams. This approach compiles all possible combinations in a single distributable file and is agnostic to how rules are expressed by the author. This enables businesses to import rules from legacy systems and handle increasingly more complex sets of rules and constraints tied to increasingly more customizable products. The concept of configuration lifecycle management (CLM), of which CPQ is a component, describes how compile-based configuration can further be leveraged to address most of the problems related to product configuration for business employing mass customization.

Industry 
The CPQ industry has many vendors. Some vendors focus more on one component, for example, a price optimization provider may integrate their pricing software with another provider's configuration engine - and vice versa.

The IT research and advisory firm Gartner estimated that the CPQ market was $1.4 billion in 2019, up 16% year over year. The market is fragmented, with the largest vendor capturing only a 17% share.

References

Business software